Chal Badam-e Kata (also Romanized as Chāl Bādām-e Katā; also known as Chāleh Bādām) is a village in Sadat Mahmudi Rural District, Pataveh District, Dana County, Kohgiluyeh and Boyer-Ahmad Province, Iran. At the 2006 census, its population was 39, in 7 families.

References 

Populated places in Dana County